Prikubansky (masculine), Prikubanskaya (feminine), or Prikubanskoye (neuter) may refer to:
Prikubansky District, Karachay-Cherkess Republic, a district of the Karachay-Cherkess Republic, Russia
Prikubansky (rural locality), name of several rural localities in Russia
Prikubansky Okrug, an administrative division of the city of Krasnodar, Krasnodar Krai, Russia